Bahman Asgari Ghoncheh (born 21 December 1991) is an Iranian karateka athlete who won a gold medal at the 2018 World Karate Championships and at the 2018 Asian Games.

2020 Summer Olympics 
Bahman Asgari  was qualified for Tokyo through the World Karate Federation's (WKF) Olympic rankings in the 75 kg category. However, he has been banned for 12 months for using a "prohibited substance" by the World Karate Federation in July 2021 and he missed the 2020 Olympics.

References

External links
asgari on instagram
ASKARI ranking in olympic

1991 births
Living people
Iranian male karateka
Asian Games gold medalists for Iran
Asian Games medalists in karate
Karateka at the 2018 Asian Games
Medalists at the 2018 Asian Games
Doping cases in karate
Iranian sportspeople in doping cases
People from Qazvin Province
21st-century Iranian people